Typhaeus typhoeus, or the minotaur beetle, is a beetle in the family Geotrupidae, also referred to as earth-boring dung beetles. They are native to Europe. The beetle is named after the Typhon, a giant of Greek mythology.

Appearance 
Minotaur beetles grow to 15 to 24 mm in length. Their bodies are black and slightly shiny all over, stout and dome-shaped. On the elytra are longitudinal grooves with punctures. There are numerous small spines on each leg. The species clearly exhibits sexual dimorphism. Characteristic of the males are three horn-like outgrowths on the pronotum. The two outer protrusions are long, while the one in the middle is short. The females instead have a few pointed humps here.

Occurrence 
The minotaur beetle is found in certain regions of Europe and North Africa. It lives in sandy, sunny areas of pine forests or in sandy moorland. They are rare elsewhere. In Germany, the minotaur beetle is an "especially protected" species and is protected under the Bundesartenschutzverordnung (BArtSchV). The adult beetles are rarely seen. More noticeable are the open, circular, about 1 cm long entrances to their living spaces, which can be found on ground with sparse vegetation.

Living habits 
The beetles feed on the dung of herbivorous animals, especially that of rabbits and small ruminants such as sheep and deer. After mating, the animals dig a vertical tunnel about 1 to 1.5 metres deep in the earth, with several side tunnels stemming from it and which ends in a chamber. Dung is brought into the chamber and is formed into a pellet. The female lays her eggs next to this pellet, not directly on top of it, in contrast to most earth-boring dung beetles. Minotaur beetles are also active in autumn and winter, as long as the top soil is not frozen. The larvae that hatch feed on the mass provision of stored dung. They pupate after one year.

Literature 
 Karl Wilhelm Harde, František Severa, Edwin Möhn: Der Kosmos Käferführer: Die mitteleuropäischen Käfer. Franckh-Kosmos Verlags-GmbH & Co, Stuttgart 2000,

References

External links
 http://www.wildlifetrusts.org/species/minotaur-beetle

Geotrupidae
Beetles described in 1758
Beetles of Europe